"There's No Stopping Your Heart" is a song written by Michael Bonagura and Craig Karp, and recorded by American country music artist Marie Osmond.  It was released in September 1985 as the third single and title track from the album There's No Stopping Your Heart.  The song was Osmond's fifth country hit and her second and last number one on the country chart as a solo artist.  The single stayed at number one for one week and spent a total of fifteen weeks on the country chart.

As a solo artist, "There's No Stopping Your Heart" was her first No. 1 hit since 1973, when she hit the top with a cover of Anita Bryant's "Paper Roses".  Just prior to her solo comeback, Osmond had a No. 1 hit duet with Dan Seals, "Meet Me in Montana".

Chart performance

References
 

1985 singles
Marie Osmond songs
Songs written by Michael Bonagura
Song recordings produced by Paul Worley
Capitol Records Nashville singles
Curb Records singles
1985 songs